The article 1985 in motoring deals with developments in the automotive industry throughout the year 1985 by various automobile manufacturers, grouped by country. The automotive industry designs, develops, manufactures, markets, and sells motor vehicles. The first practical automobile with a petrol engine was built by Karl Benz in 1885 in Mannheim, Germany.

United Kingdom
ARG had a fairly quiet year in 1985, with the only significant changes being the addition of an MG variant to the Montego range. The MG Metro 6R4, a mid-engine supercar was introduced for rallies, with a four-wheel drive and a V6 engine. The MG version of the Maestro was upgraded from a 1.6 to a 2.0, with the twin Weber carburettors making way for electronic fuel injection.

Ford introduced latest incarnation of its big Granada. The new car, which went on sale in May, was a hatchback-only design which brought back memories of the Sierra's launch nearly three years ago. Ford has refused to rule out the possibility of saloon and estate versions at a later date, but the current hatchback is proving popular thanks to its high equipment levels, comfortable interior, solid build and (for a car of the size and level of specification) a competitive asking price. On the continent the "Scorpio" name covers the whole range, while Britain and Ireland only see the new nameplate as an extra on range-topping 2.8 and 2.9 V6 models, which are known as "Granada Scorpio".

A year after its launch, the Vauxhall Astra hatchback and estate ranges have been joined by a saloon. Rather than adopt the same name as used by the hatchback, Vauxhall has been the latest of several manufacturers to follow a new trend of creating a new name for the saloon version. The saloon version of the Astra is known as the "Belmont", while the continental version shares the Kadett name with the rest of the range. The new model would launch in January 1986.

France 
Peugeot announces that the Talbot marque will be discontinued on passenger cars next year, and the Horizon replacement launched in October 1985 will instead be sold as the Peugeot 309. A larger family saloon is due for a 1987 launch, effectively taking over from the outdated Rapier/Minx (formerly Alpine) models and replacing at least some of the 305 or 505 ranges.

Renault launched the second-generation of the R5 at the start of the year and offered a more modern appearance and more interior space than its 13-year-old predecessor.

Italy
The recent revival at Lancia has been completed with the addition of two new very different cars. The marque's new entry-level model is the Y10 - a three-door compact hatchback which can be seen as an Autobianchi on the continent. Power (though not a great deal of it) comes from a 1.0 FIRE engine which is very economical, and also from a long-running 1.1 unit which was seen more than a decade ago in the Autobianchi A112 Abarth. This larger unit comes with a turbocharger and pumps out an impressive 76 bhp, making it the far more impressive of the car's two engines.

Also new on the Lancia price list is the Thema, a large four-door saloon which is designed to compete with the upmarket likes of the BMW 5 Series. It is designed by Pininfarina and few of its competitors can match it for interior space and comfort. Equipment levels, refinement, ride and handling are good too. It is the first of four cars to be spawned from a new platform which is to be shared between Fiat and General Motors. The second of these cars goes on sale this year - the Saab 9000. The third and fourth cars - from Fiat and Alfa Romeo respectively - are expected to be on sale within two years. The base engine is a 2.0 unit, which is also available with a turbocharger. The range-topper is a 2.8 V6, and there will soon be an exciting Ferrari-engined version which is set to sell in limited numbers.

Sweden
Saab has expanded its range with its first competitor in the sector dominated by the BMW 5 Series - the Saab 9000. The new car is a spacious, well-equipped, comfortable and refined five-door hatchback which shares its underpinnings with the new Lancia Thema as well as two forthcoming new big cars from Fiat and Alfa Romeo. With a practical hatchback bodystyle housing a top-notch luxury interior, the Saab 9000 appears to have all the right ingredients for a successful BMW rival.

Germany
The Mercedes E-Class is the latest of this year's competitors in the market sector dominated by the BMW 5 Series. The offering from Mercedes is a four-door saloon and five-door estate with the highest levels of specification and quality you can expect on this size of car. The whole estate range and some of the saloons have the option of self-levelling suspension, an innovation which was created by Citroen. The range starts with a moderately powerful 2.3 petrol engine, which like the entire range has fuel injection. Top of the range is a 3.2 V6, though even more fast and powerful V8 engines are rumoured at a later date.

Volkswagen launched a 4-wheel drive version of the Golf mk2, called the Golf Country. The company also expanded the already impressive Golf range with a 16-valve version of the GTI. The original 1.8 8-valve GTI was a highly impressive "hot hatchback" which has proved itself even better than the first Golf GTI of 1976, but the new, more powerful GTI is one of the fastest hatchbacks ever produced with a top speed of well over 120 mph. It has the handling, looks and quality to match its high speed, and the Golf is fast becoming one of the fashion icons of the 1980s.

Spain
With SEAT no longer involved with Fiat, the new Ibiza is the Spanish firm's first design not to have been derived from a Fiat. It was penned by world-famous Italian designer Giorgetto Giugiaro, but mysteriously uses the same suspension as the Fiat Strada, and is the first SEAT to be imported to the UK. Its engines have been developed in conjunction with Porsche, and as a result its advertising campaign features the slogan "Italian styling and German engines" - which appear to be an impressive combination. The car's price is significantly lower than that of the similarly sized Ford Escort, which suggests that it is not up to the standards of more mainstream rivals. In this case, the answer is "yes", but the Ibiza isn't far off.

Japan
Nissan is in the process of building a new plant at Sunderland in order to cut the cost of exporting cars to Europe. The new factory is set to open in the summer of next year, and will churn out the Bluebird range. There are future plans for the entry-level Micra to be built at Sunderland.

References

Motoring by year
Motoring